Kubicek Balloons (in Czech Balóny Kubíček (pronounced Koo-bee-check), the complete official name BALÓNY KUBÍČEK spol. s r.o.) is a Czech manufacturer of hot-air balloons and airships, the sole such manufacturer in Central and Eastern Europe and one of the largest in the world. From its factory in Brno the company ships its products worldwide.

History
BALÓNY KUBÍČEK was founded in 1989 by Aleš Kubíček, the designer of first modern Czech hot-air balloon, made in 1983 in Aviatik club in Brno. Before founding his own company Aleš Kubíček made several balloons under wings of the company Aerotechnik Kunovice. Immediately after the Velvet Revolution he started his own private company to manufacture lighter-than-air aircraft.

Today
Kubicek Balloons is a limited company, mostly owned by the founder Aleš Kubíček. Its headquarters is on Francouzská 81 in Brno city centre, where balloons were originally made. But in 2005 their production moved to a completely new factory facility in Jarní 2a in Brno-Maloměřice, currently the most modern balloon factory in the World. The company has 30 employees (in 2008) and produces circa 90 balloons per year, making it the world's 3rd largest manufacturer of hot air balloons.

As well as producing standard balloon envelopes in 47 types and sizes they also build baskets, burners and a plenty of man carrying specially shaped balloons for advertising purposes e.g. 38-metre tall flying bear, sea container DHL, Abbey of Saint Gall and the green heart of Styria.

Kubicek Balloons holds quality certificates for design, production and maintenance meeting European standards of EASA and was it amongst the first hot-air balloon manufacturers to hold a European type certificate for hot-air balloons.

Kubicek balloons is the only European producer who uses the unique high-tenacity polyester balloon fabric for envelopes, and it is all manufactured 'in house' by its sister-company Textil Kubíček in Černá Hora near Brno.

* forecast

Large inflatable structures

The company has also produced large inflatables for a variety of purposes under the name Kubicek Visionair for artists, companies and organisations around the world, including inflatable Moons and large inflatable structures for events and other applications.

Fixed-wing aircraft
The company also produces the Kubicek M-2 Scout ultralight and light-sport aircraft, under the name Kubicek Aircraft.

References

External links

 
 Official inflatable website

Aircraft manufacturers of the Czech Republic and Czechoslovakia
Balloon manufacturers
Companies based in Brno
Manufacturing companies established in 1989
Czech brands
1989 establishments in Czechoslovakia